The Nikon Coolpix A is digital large-sensor compact camera announced by Nikon on March 5, 2013. It is Nikon's first consumer-oriented camera with a DX (APS-C) sensor, announced on March 5, 2013. It is the company's flagship Coolpix camera, but has Program/Shutter priority/Aperture priority/Manual (PSAM) modes and menu system which is much more similar to a DSLR than its Coolpix predecessors.

Features
 16MP DX sensor
 3.0" 921K LCD monitor 
 Wi-Fi ready (requires WU-1a wireless module)
 Made in Japan
 CMOS sensor
 18.5mm lens, 28mm equiv. on 35mm format
 1080p 30/25/24P video recording
 JPEG and NEF (raw) picture recording
 SD card storage with SDHC and SDXC support

See also 
 Nikon
 Nikon Coolpix series

References

http://www.dpreview.com/products/nikon/compacts/nikon_cpa/specifications

External links 
Nikon Coolpix A Nikon

A
Cameras introduced in 2013